Joel Bruce Kramer (born October 30, 1955) is a retired American professional basketball player. After playing college basketball at San Diego State University, he had a five-season career in the National Basketball Association (NBA) from 1978–1983 with the Phoenix Suns.

Early life
Kramer was born in San Diego, California, and is Jewish. He attended Patrick Henry High School in San Diego. There, he played for the basketball team and was League Player of the Year and All-California Interscholastic Federation his senior season.

Basketball career
Kramer played college basketball on a basketball scholarship at San Diego State University, during which he averaged 9.6 points and 7.2 rebounds per game, while shooting .521 from the field. After recovering from a broken foot, he averaged over 9 rebounds per game his last two seasons. In 1977-78, he set a school consecutive free throw record of 33. As a senior, he was named 1978 Pacific Coast Athletic Association Player of the Year.

He played basketball for Team USA at the 1977 Maccabiah Games, winning a gold medal.

Kramer was selected with the 19th pick of the third round by the Phoenix Suns in the 1978 NBA Draft. He had a five-year career in the National Basketball Association (NBA) from 1978–1983, primarily at center and power forward. In his rookie season, he played in 82 games, tying for the NBA lead, and in 1980-81 he was third in the NBA with 82 games played.

After playing for the Suns, Kramer continued his playing career in Israel with Maccabi Tel Aviv, for whom he played for just a few months after signing for a reported $100,000 a year. He was released in January 1984.

Post-playing career
Kramer was inducted into the Southern California Jewish Sports Hall of Fame in 1993. He was inducted into the San Diego Aztecs Hall of Fame in 1997.

Kramer has held executive roles with CBIZ, an American accounting and financial services firm, working as the managing director of the Phoenix office's tax division .

See also
 List of select Jewish basketball players

Notes

External links
NBA stats @ basketballreference.com

1955 births
Living people
21st-century American Jews
American expatriate basketball people in Israel
American men's basketball players
Basketball players from San Diego
Competitors at the 1977 Maccabiah Games
Israeli Basketball Premier League players
Jewish men's basketball players
Jewish American sportspeople
Maccabiah Games gold medalists for the United States
Maccabiah Games medalists in basketball
Maccabi Tel Aviv B.C. players
Phoenix Suns draft picks
Phoenix Suns players
San Diego State Aztecs men's basketball players
Small forwards